Lohardaga is a town and the district headquarters of Lohardaga district in the Indian state of Jharkhand, west of Ranchi, the state capital.  Earlier (early 1900s) Lohardaga was the commissionary headquarters for Chotanagpur.  It was only later that the commissionary of Chotanagpur was shifted to Ranchi.  The commissioner's office still exists and it houses the Lohardaga Municipality office.

Geography

Location
It has an average elevation of 647 metres (2122 feet).

Economy
Lohardaga is known as the land of bauxite mines. Multiple organizations, especially Hindalco, operate bauxite mines near Lohardaga. Bauxite extracted from the mines around Lohardaga are sent to alumina refineries across various states of India.

Demographics
 India census, Lohardaga had a population of 57,411. Males constitute 52% of the population and females 48%. Lohardaga has an average literacy rate of 85.37%, higher than the national average of 59.5%: male literacy is 89.80%, and female literacy is 80.75%. In Lohardaga, 15% of the population is under 6 years of age.

See also
 Lohardaga district

References

External links
 Travel guide and maps of Lohardaga district
 Government website for Lohardaga District

Cities and towns in Lohardaga district